In geometry, Legendre's theorem on spherical triangles, named after Adrien-Marie Legendre, is stated as follows:

 Let ABC be a spherical triangle on the unit sphere with small sides a, b, c. Let A'B'C' be the planar triangle with the same sides.  Then the angles of the spherical triangle exceed the corresponding angles of the planar triangle by approximately one third of the spherical excess (the spherical excess is the amount by which the sum of the three angles exceeds ).

The theorem was very important in simplifying the heavy numerical work in calculating the results of traditional (pre-GPS and pre-computer) geodetic surveys from about 1800 until the middle of the twentieth century.

The  theorem  was stated by   who provided a proof (1798)  in a supplement to the report of the measurement of the French meridional arc used in the definition of the metre . Legendre does not claim that he was the originator of the theorem despite the attribution to him.  maintains that the method was in common use by surveyors at the time and may have been used as early as 1740 by La Condamine for the calculation of the Peruvian meridional arc.

Girard's theorem states that the spherical excess of a triangle, E, is equal to its area, Δ, and therefore Legendre's theorem may be written as

The excess, or area, of small triangles is very small. For example, consider an equilateral spherical triangle with sides of 60 km on a spherical Earth of radius 6371 km; the side  corresponds to an angular distance of 60/6371=.0094, or approximately 10−2 radians (subtending an angle of 0.57° at the centre). The area of such a small triangle is well approximated by that of a planar equilateral triangle with the same sides: a2sin(/3) = 0.0000433 radians corresponding to 8.9″.

When the sides of the triangles exceed 180 km, for which the excess is about  80″, the relations between the areas and the differences of the angles must be corrected by terms of fourth order in the sides, amounting to no more than 0.01″:

(Δ′ is the area of the planar triangle.)

The theorem may be extended to the ellipsoid if  a, b, c are calculated by dividing the true lengths by the square root of the product of the principal radii of curvature (see  Chapter 5) at the median latitude of the vertices (in place of a spherical radius).  provided more exact formulae.

References

Spherical trigonometry